Bernal is a city located in the northeast of Quilmes in the province of Buenos Aires, approximately 10 miles south of the city of Buenos Aires.  It is the second largest and most populated city in the Partido of Quilmes. Bernal borders Avellaneda Partido and Lanús Partido to the north-west, the city of Quilmes to the south-east, Almirante Brown Partido and Lomas de Zamora Partido to the south-west the Río de la Plata to the north-east.
	
Bernal consists of the neighborhoods of Barrio Parque, Villa Cramer, Villa Alcira, and Bernal Centre, among others. The Railway General Roca divides the city in two.

History 
The Bernals were an old family from the days of colonial Buenos Aires. In the mid-19th century, a descendant of the family, Don Pedro Bernal, established a farm in the Partido of Quilmes, and built a house on that site. In 1850, he divided the land up into smaller farms which were then settled by other prominent families, such as the Molina Salas, Ayersa, Tasso, and Bagley. 1850 is deemed as the official foundation year of the City of Bernal.

Population 

In 2001, Bernal had with 109,790 inhabitants (INDEC, 2001) the second largest population in the Partido of Quilmes, roughly 25% of the total partido population : 76,499 in West Bernal, 33,415 in East Bernal. These numbers imply a population growth of 15% compared with the figures of the 1991 INDEC Census which had shown a population of 111,361 inhabitants.

References

External links
 National University of Quilmes
 Historical photographs gallery 
 bernal.com.ar, information of Bernal's history, location, and pictures 
 barrioparquebernal.com.ar, Barrio Parque Bernal 
 Comprehensive study on the history of the town 

Quilmes Partido
Populated places in Buenos Aires Province
Cities in Argentina